Bruce Ellington (born August 22, 1991) is a former American football wide receiver. He played college football at South Carolina and was drafted by the San Francisco 49ers in the fourth round of the 2014 NFL Draft.

High school career
In high school, Ellington played both basketball and American football at Moncks Corner (SC) Berkeley located in Moncks Corner, South Carolina.  Ellington attended the same high school as his cousin, Andre Ellington. In 2009, Ellington played quarterback and led the Stags to the Division II-AAAA state championship in 2009 as a quarterback for head coach Jerry Brown. In the 2009 state championship game, Ellington rushed for four touchdowns. Ellington was a finalist for South Carolina's "Mr. Football" as well.  On the hardwood as a senior, Ellington averaged 22 points, eight rebounds, and six assists per game and was named the South Carolina Coaches Association 4A Player of the Year, the Region 7-4A Player of the Year, and the Post and Courier Athlete of the Year. Ellington was a McDonald's All-America nominee following his senior season. As a basketball recruit, Ellington was rated as a four-star recruit by ESPN (93 overall rating) and a four-star recruit by Rivals (24th-ranked point guard and 96th-ranked player overall). As a football recruit, ESPN rated Ellington as a four-star recruit as well and listed him as an athlete.

College career
Ellington played both basketball and American football at the University of South Carolina. After playing only basketball in the 2010 season, he joined the football team in 2011 and played both sports throughout his college career. As a football player, he had 106 career receptions for 1,586 yards and 16 touchdowns. As a basketball player, he averaged 11.2 points, 2.7 rebounds, three assists, and one steal per game.

Ellington announced on January 3, 2014 that he would forgo his senior season and enter the 2014 NFL Draft.  Although Ellington would forgo his senior season, he was still able to graduate with a degree in sociology during the 3 and 1/2 years that he was at the University of South Carolina.

Professional career

San Francisco 49ers
The San Francisco 49ers selected Ellington in the fourth round (106th overall) of the 2014 NFL Draft. He was the 17th wide receiver selected in 2014.

On May 27, 2014, the San Francisco 49ers signed Ellington to a four-year, $2.69 million contract that includes a signing bonus of $474,428.

He caught his first career touchdown on a 20-yard reception from quarterback Blaine Gabbert against the Denver Broncos. On December 20, 2014, Ellington had two touchdowns against the San Diego Chargers. An eight-yard touchdown pass from quarterback Colin Kaepernick and a one-yard touchdown run, giving him three touchdowns in his rookie season.

The 49ers placed him on injured reserve due to a hamstring injury on August 30, 2016.

On August 3, 2017, Ellington was waived by the 49ers.

New York Jets 
On August 3, 2017, Ellington was claimed off waivers by the New York Jets. He was waived on August 5, 2017 after failing his physical.

Houston Texans
On August 11, 2017, Ellington signed with the Houston Texans.

On September 10, Ellington made his Texans debut in a 29–7 loss to the Jacksonville Jaguars. He was placed on injured reserve on December 5, 2017. In 11 games with the Texans, Ellington had 29 catches for 330 yards and two touchdowns.

On March 14, 2018, Ellington signed a one-year contract to remain with the Texans. He was placed on injured reserve on September 25, 2018 with a hamstring injury. On October 31, he was released.

Detroit Lions
On November 6, 2018, Ellington was signed by the Detroit Lions. He was placed on injured reserve on December 22, 2018. Overall, he finished the 2018 season with 31 receptions for 224 yards and one touchdown. On February 15, 2019, Ellington was released by the Lions.

New England Patriots 
On March 14, 2019, Ellington signed a one-year contract with the New England Patriots. He was released on May 8, 2019, with an injury designation.

Personal life
His cousin Andre Ellington is a former NFL running back. The two were teammates on the 2017 Texans.

References

External links
Detroit Lions bio
South Carolina Gamecocks football bio
South Carolina Gamecocks basketball bio

1991 births
Living people
People from Moncks Corner, South Carolina
Players of American football from South Carolina
Basketball players from South Carolina
Point guards
American football wide receivers
South Carolina Gamecocks football players
South Carolina Gamecocks men's basketball players
San Francisco 49ers players
New York Jets players
Houston Texans players
Detroit Lions players
New England Patriots players
American men's basketball players